Lieutenant Colonel Arthur ("Art") B. (Brent) Alphin (born September 5, 1948)  is a retired United States Army officer and military historian.

He is the founder and owner of A-Square, manufacturer of American hunting rifles. He taught military history at West Point. Since retiring he has co-authored several books with his wife and children's author Elaine Marie Alphin.

He also assisted ghostwriter Lisa Harkrader in writing Animorphs #51: The Absolute, by providing her with information about tanks and reading over the book to check for errors.

Works

References

External links 
 Biography of LTC Arthur B. Alphin, USA (Ret.), arthuralphin.com 

United States Army colonels
Living people
American manufacturing businesspeople
United States Military Academy faculty
Place of birth missing (living people)
20th-century American non-fiction writers
21st-century American non-fiction writers
20th-century American male writers
1948 births
21st-century American historians
American male non-fiction writers
21st-century American male writers